Alberto Capitta (born 1954 in Sassari) is an Italian writer.

Biography 
Alberto Capitta currently lives and works in Sassari as an actor and playwright. His novel Creaturine (Il Maestrale 2004, Frassinelli 2005) was finalist for the Strega Prize, one of Italy's most influential and controversial literary awards.

In 2006 he received the prize Lo Straniero, "as one of the most interesting writers of an extraordinary Sardinian flowering", namely of the Sardinian Literary Spring, started in the late eighties of the last century by a group of young writers including Marcello Fois and others (and  eventually even some not so young like Giulio Angioni), Salvatore Mannuzzu and Sergio Atzeni, after the works of individual figures such as Grazia Deledda, Emilio Lussu, Giuseppe Dessì, Gavino Ledda, Salvatore Satta.

Works 
 Il cielo nevica, Guaraldi 1999; Il Maestrale 2007
 Creaturine, Il Maestrale 2004; Il Maestrale / Frassinelli 2005
 Il giardino non-esiste, Il Maestrale 2008
 Alberi erranti e naufraghi, Il Maestrale 2013
 L'ultima trasfigurazione di Ferdinand, Il Maestrale 2016

Bibliography 
 Goffredo Fofi, Sardegna, che Nouvelle vague!, Panorama, November 2003 .

References

External links 
 https://web.archive.org/web/20150812192615/http://www.lostraniero.net/premio/113-premio-2006-tricase.html] Official website of the Prize "Lo Straniero"; winners of the year 2006
 Official website of the publishing house il Maestrale

21st-century Italian novelists
People from the Province of Sassari
1954 births
Living people
Italian male novelists
21st-century Italian male writers